Michael Braungart (born 1958) is a German chemist who advocates that humans can make a positive instead of a negative environmental impact by redesigning industrial production and therefore that dissipation is not waste.  A former Greenpeace activist who once lived in a tree as protest, he is now considered to be a visionary environmental thinker.

Founder of EPEA International Umweltforschung GmbH in Hamburg, Germany, and co-founder of MBDC McDonough Braungart Design Chemistry in Charlottesville, Virginia, Dr. Braungart is currently a professor for Eco-Design at Leuphana University of Lüneburg.

He currently holds the Cradle-to-Cradle chair at the Erasmus University Rotterdam, the Netherlands.

Career
After completing studies in Process Engineering in Darmstadt, Germany, Dr. Braungart went on to investigate the chemical processes of industrial production techniques with the Chemistry Department at Konstanz, Germany. He subsequently led the formation of the Chemistry Section of Greenpeace International. By the time he completed his PhD in chemistry at the University of Hannover in 1985, he had assumed leadership of Greenpeace Chemistry.

In 1987, Dr. Braungart founded the EPEA Umweltforschung in Hamburg.  At the heart of EPEA is Cradle to Cradle Design, to create products oriented toward a life-cycle economy.

In addition to his achievements with EPEA, Dr. Braungart also serves as Scientific Manager of the Hamburg Environmental Institute, the non-profit research center which produces the "Top 50 Study". This study ranks the quality of environmentally sound production of companies within the chemical industry.   He has initiated scholarly and scientific inquiry into the adverse environmental and physiological impacts of industrially produced consumer goods.

Dr. Braungart also works together with American architect and designer William A. McDonough in their product design and development firm, McDonough Braungart Design Chemistry. In partnership with McDonough, Braungart released the book Cradle to Cradle: Remaking the Way We Make Things in 2002.

Books
 . Served as development guidelines for the World's Fair in Hannover, 2000. 
 
The Upcycle, with William McDonough, North Point Press, 2013,

See also
William McDonough
The Environmental Institute

References

External links

 The Next Industrial Revolution, a Documentary film about William McDonough and Michael Braungart
Dust to Dust no longer an interview with Michael Braungart, in Science & Theology News by Chhavi Sachdev
Braungart.com
Royal Institute of British Architecture: William McDonough & Michael Braungart: Cradle to Cradle (video)
Cradle to Cradle Design: A Deeper Shade of Green  Watch for products that meet this stringent new eco-certification standard Amanda Kimble  Mother Earth News Feb./March 2011
"A Friendly Tsunami", interview with Michael Braungart in Digital Development Debates, July 2015.

1958 births
Living people
Non-fiction environmental writers
People from Schwäbisch Gmünd
20th-century German chemists
German environmentalists
University of Hanover alumni
Academic staff of Erasmus University Rotterdam